Royal Air Force Fulbeck or more simply RAF Fulbeck is a former Royal Air Force station located  east of Newark-on-Trent, Nottinghamshire and  west of Sleaford, Lincolnshire, England.

During the war it was used primarily as troop carrier airfield for airborne units. After the war it was closed in 1948.

History

USAAF use
It was known as USAAF Station AAF-488 for security reasons by the USAAF during the war, and by which it was referred to instead of location.  Its USAAF Station Code was "FB".

434th Troop Carrier Group 
In October 1943, the 434th Troop Carrier Group arrived at Fulbeck from Baer AAF, Indiana. The group was assigned to the 53d Troop Carrier Wing and flew Douglas C-47/C-53 Skytrains. Operational squadrons of the 434th and fuselage codes were:
 71st Troop Carrier (CJ)
 72d Troop Carrier (CU)
 73d Troop Carrier (CN)
 74th Troop Carrier (ID)

The 434th TCG had 56 C-47s and started training with some detachments elsewhere until finally moving to RAF Welford on 10 December 1943.

442d Troop Carrier Group
At the end of March 1944 the 442d Troop Carrier Group arrived at Fulbeck from Baer AAF, Indiana. The group was assigned to the 50th Troop Carrier Wing and flew Douglas C-47/C-53 Skytrains. Operational squadrons of the 442d and fuselage codes were:
 303d Troop Carrier (J7)
 304th Troop Carrier (V4)
 305th Troop Carrier (4J)
 306th Troop Carrier (7H)

The 442d TCG moved to RAF Weston Zoyland in mid-June after having taken part in the D-Day operations.

440th Troop Carrier Group
During the following two months there was little activity at Fulbeck until some C-47s of the  440th Troop Carrier Group arrived in September 1944 from RAF Exeter to use Fulbeck as part of Operation Market, the air component of Operation Market-Garden.

RAF Bomber Command use
The IX Troop Carrier Command relinquished the airfield back to the RAF in late September and No. 5 Group Bomber Command moved in the distinguished No. 49 Squadron from Fiskerton, an airfield which was transferred to No. 1 Group the following month.

On 2 November the recently formed No. 189 Squadron arrived from Bardney having taken part in its first operation the previous day. Both Nos. 49 and 189 Squadron's Lancasters remained based at Fulbeck until April 1945. No. 49 flew some 60 raids from the airfield losing 15 aircraft and No. 189 took part in 40 raids with 16 aircraft lost. No. 189 moved back to Bardney on the 8th of the month and No. 49 moved to Syerston on the 22nd. On the morning of transfer, a No. 49 Squadron Lancaster making a low farewell pass across the airfield crashed into the technical area and of the resulting 24 casualties among air and ground personnel, 15 were fatal.

Bomber Command operations from Fulbeck cost 38 Lancasters, either failing to return or destroyed in crashes.

1945 Avro Lancaster Crash
on the 22 April 1945 a Royal Air Force, Avro Lancaster Mk III (PB463) of the 49 Squadron had taken off from the base bound for RAF Syerston. Shortly after lifting off the aircraft caught fire & crashed into a depot. All Six crew & Fifteen on the ground died

Current use
  
The runways, apart from narrow strips used as farm roads, were removed in the 1970s and all but three of the hardstandings but the perimeter track was kept intact. Small sections of the 30 and 10 runway ends, however, still exist in their full width.  At one time Fulbeck was proposed for a nuclear waste disposal site.

See also

 List of former Royal Air Force stations

References

Citations

Bibliography

External links

 Photographs of RAF Fulbeck from the Geograph British Isles project
 http://armyairforces.com 434th, 442d Troop Carrier Wings

Royal Air Force stations in Lincolnshire
Airfields of the IX Troop Carrier Command in the United Kingdom
1945 disasters in the United Kingdom
Aviation accidents and incidents locations in England